Vitula is a genus of snout moths. It was described by Émile Louis Ragonot in 1887.

Species
 Vitula aegerella Neunzig, 1990
 Vitula biviella Zeller, 1848
 Vitula broweri (Heinrich, 1956)
 Vitula coconinoana Neunzig, 1990 
 Vitula divergens (Dyar, 1914)
 Vitula edmandsii (Packard, 1864)
 Vitula inanimella (Dyar, 1919)
 Vitula insula Neunzig, 1990
 Vitula laura (Dyar, 1919)
 Vitula lugubrella (Ragonot, 1887)
 Vitula pinei Heinrich, 1956
 Vitula setonella (McDunnough, 1927)

References

Phycitini
Pyralidae genera
Taxa named by Émile Louis Ragonot